Lymphocyte-specific protein 1 pseudogene is a protein that in humans is encoded by the LOC645166 gene.

References

Further reading 

Pseudogenes